Amil Mammedali oglu Maharramov (born December 24, 1974, in Azerbaijan) is an Azerbaijani economist and professor.

Early life and education

Maharramov Amil Mammedalioglu was born on 24 December 1974 in Baku (Azerbaijani Republic). In 1991 he finished school No. 54 in Baku.

In 1991-1996 he graduated from Baku State University faculty “Social sciences and psychology”, specialty “Economic theory” with honors. In 1996-2000 he graduated from post-graduate course at Baku State University by majoring in economic theory.

Career
He started work in December 1995 as a chief technician in the Institute of Economy in the Azerbaijan National Academia of Sciences. In 1999, he served as lecturer at the Baku State University. From 1999 to 2006 he was a lecturer, senior lecturer, docent in the Department of International Economic Relations and Management. From the 2002 he worked as deputy dean for international relations and international law. Since 2006 he has been a docent and the head of the department of Organization of Customs Business and management. Since 2015 he has been professor of this department.

Maharramov is the author of 190 scientific studies, including 5 monographs, 20 training programs, 1 manual, 1 tutorial and 10 textbooks.  About 40 scientific articles was published in the materials of international conferences, symposia and congresses.

His main topics of scientific researches are foreign economic activity, new economic problems, and problems of the Development of Education.

Publications

Monographs
Theoretical and practical problems of formation and progress of custom policy (in Azerbaijan Republic's practice). Monograph, Baku, 2009
 Entrepreneurship: from theory to practice. Monograph, Baku, 2009
Foreign economic relations of Azerbaijan: achievements and perspectives. Monograph, Baku, 2015
Modern bank system and banking Monograph, Baku, 2015
Social defence and its role in the formation human capital. Monograph, Baku, 2018
Baku State University and economic science in Azerbaijan. Monograph, Baku, 2019

Books
Regulation of foreign economic activity. Textbook, Baku, 2008
Economic diplomacy. Textbook, Baku, 2009
Azerbaijan economy. Textbook, Baku, 2011
Business economics. Textbook, Baku, 2013
Economic diplomacy (2nd edition). Textbook, Baku, 2013
Economy of firms. Textbook, Baku, 2019
Banking.Textbook, Baku, 2019
Economics. Textbook, Baku, 2019
Introduction to the economy. Textbook, Baku, 2019
Economic diplomacy (3rd edition). Textbook, Baku, 2020

As editor
Co-editor of the “International law and integration problems” magazine.
Chairman of the editorial board of the journal "Economic and Political Science"
“The Great Economical Encyclopedia” in 7 parts. Baku, “East-West” publishing house, 2012-2015. Deputy Chief Editor.
Member of editorial board of the “Tafakkur” University magazine. The center of science and education “Tafakkur” .
Member of the editorial board of the scientific magazine “Cooperation” of the University of Cooperation of the Azerbaijan.
Member of the editorial board of “Humanities and Social Science Research” in USA

References

1974 births
Living people
Azerbaijani nobility
Scientists from Baku
Academic staff of Baku State University
Baku State University alumni